The 2021 Pennzoil 150 at the Brickyard was the 21st stock car race of the 2021 NASCAR Xfinity Series, the 10th iteration of the event, and the second NASCAR Xfinity Series has used the road course at Indianapolis. The race was held on Saturday, August 14, 2021 at Speedway, Indiana in Indianapolis Motor Speedway road course, a  road course built inside of the speedway. The race took 62 laps to complete. Austin Cindric of Team Penske would win the race, while A. J. Allmendinger of Kaulig Racing and Justin Haley of Kaulig Racing got 2nd and 3rd, respectfully.

Background 

The Indianapolis Motor Speedway, located in Speedway, Indiana, (an enclave suburb of Indianapolis) in the United States, is the home of the Indianapolis 500 and the Brickyard 400.

Constructed in 1909, it is the original speedway, the first racing facility so named. It has a permanent seating capacity estimated at 235,000 with infield seating raising capacity to an approximate 400,000. It is the highest-capacity sports venue in the world.

Entry list 

*Driver would change to Chase Elliott due to Annett's leg injury.

**Driver changed to James Davison due to Tilley's shoulder injury.

***Driver changed to J. J. Yeley due to Max Papis testing positive for COVID-19 during the weekend.

Practice 
The first and final practice would take place on Friday, August 13. Austin Cindric of Team Penske would set the fastest time.

Qualifying 
Qualifying would take place on Saturday, August 14, starting at 11:03 EST. A. J. Allmendinger of Kaulig Racing would set the fastest time.

8 drivers would fail to qualify: the #15 of Mike Skeen, the #66 of Matt Jaskol, the #74 of Bayley Currey, the #13 of Stephen Leicht, the #6 of Ryan Eversley, the #33 of Loris Hezemans, the #42 of Giorgio Maggi, and the #52 of Gray Gaulding.

Race

Race results 
Stage 1 Laps: 20

Stage 2 Laps: 20

Stage 3 Laps: 20

References

2021 NASCAR Xfinity Series
NASCAR races at Indianapolis Motor Speedway
Pennzoil 150
Pennzoil 150